Symphurus is a genus of fish in the family Cynoglossidae found in the Atlantic, Indian and Pacific Ocean. Most species mainly occur in relatively shallow water, including estuaries. Some species are also found in deeper water, including S. thermophilus that lives at hydrothermal vents (the only flatfish known from this habitat). These species are distinguished by merged dorsal, caudal and anal fins, the absence of a lateral line and pectoral fins, and the presence of only one pelvic fin. They are sinistral flatfishes, meaning that as adults, their crania are asymmetrical, with both eyes on the left side.

Species
There are currently 78 recognized species in this genus:
 Symphurus arawak C. R. Robins & J. E. Randall, 1965 (Caribbean tonguefish)
 Symphurus atramentatus D. S. Jordan & Bollman, 1890 (Ink-spot tonguefish)
 Symphurus atricauda (D. S. Jordan & C. H. Gilbert, 1880) (California tonguefish)
 Symphurus australis McCulloch, 1907
 Symphurus bathyspilus Krabbenhoft & Munroe, 2003
 Symphurus billykrietei Munroe, 1998 (Kriete's tonguefish)
 Symphurus callopterus Munroe & Mahadeva, 1989 (Chocolate tonguefish)
 Symphurus caribbeanus Munroe, 1991
 Symphurus chabanaudi Mahadeva & Munroe, 1990 (Chabanaud's tonguefish)
 Symphurus civitatium Ginsburg, 1951 (Offshore tonguefish)
 Symphurus diabolicus Mahadeva & Munroe, 1990 (Devil's tonguefish)
 Symphurus diomedeanus (Goode & T. H. Bean, 1885) (Spotted-fin tonguefish)
 Symphurus elongatus (Günther, 1868) (Elongated tonguefish)
 Symphurus fasciolaris C. H. Gilbert, 1892 (Banded tonguefish)
 Symphurus fuscus A. B. Brauer, 1906
 Symphurus gilesii (Alcock, 1889)
 Symphurus ginsburgi Menezes & Benvegnú, 1976 (Ginsburg's tonguefish)
 Symphurus gorgonae Chabanaud, 1948 (Gorgonian tonguefish)
 Symphurus holothuriae Chabanaud, 1948 
 Symphurus hondoensis C. L. Hubbs, 1915 
 Symphurus insularis Munroe, Brito & C. Hernández, 2000
 Symphurus jenynsi Evermann & Kendall, 1906 (Jenyn's tonguefish)
 Symphurus kyaropterygium Menezes & Benvegnú, 1976
 Symphurus leei D. S. Jordan & Bollman, 1890 (Lee's tonguefish)
 Symphurus leucochilus M. Y. Lee, Munroe & K. T. Shao, 2014 
 Symphurus ligulatus (Cocco, 1844) 
 Symphurus longirostris M. Y. Lee, Munroe & Y. Kai, 2016 (Long-snout tonguefish) 
 Symphurus lubbocki Munroe, 1990
 Symphurus luzonensis Chabanaud, 1955
 Symphurus macrophthalmus Norman, 1939
 Symphurus maculopinnis Munroe, J. Tyler & Tunnicliffe, 2011 
 Symphurus maldivensis Chabanaud, 1955
 Symphurus marginatus (Goode & T. H. Bean, 1886) (Margined tonguefish)
 Symphurus marmoratus Fowler, 1934
 Symphurus megasomus M. Y. Lee, H. M. Chen & K. T. Shao, 2009 (Giant tonguefish)
 Symphurus melanurus H. W. Clark, 1936 (Drab tonguefish)
 Symphurus melasmatotheca Munroe & Nizinski, 1990 (Black-stripe tonguefish)
 Symphurus microlepis Garman, 1899 (Small-fin tonguefish)
 Symphurus microrhynchus (M. C. W. Weber, 1913)
 Symphurus minor Ginsburg, 1951 (Large-scale tonguefish)
 Symphurus monostigmus Munroe, 2006
 Symphurus multimaculatus M. Y. Lee, Munroe & H. M. Chen, 2009 (Pepper-dot tonguefish)
 Symphurus nebulosus (Goode & T. H. Bean, 1883) (Freckled tonguefish)
 Symphurus nigrescens Rafinesque, 1810 (Tonguefish)
 Symphurus normani Chabanaud, 1950 (Norman's tonguefish)
 Symphurus novemfasciatus S. C. Shen & W. W. Lin, 1984
 Symphurus ocellaris Munroe & D. R. Robertson, 2005 (Ring-tail tonguefish)
 Symphurus ocellatus von Bonde, 1922 (Double-spot tonguefish)
 Symphurus oculellus Munroe, 1991
 Symphurus oligomerus Mahadeva & Munroe, 1990 (Spot-fin tonguefish)
 Symphurus ommaspilus J. E. Böhlke, 1961 (Ocellated tonguefish)
 Symphurus orientalis (Bleeker, 1879)
 Symphurus parvus Ginsburg, 1951 (Pygmy tonguefish)
 Symphurus pelicanus Ginsburg, 1951 (Long-tail tonguefish)
 Symphurus piger (Goode & T. H. Bean, 1886) (Deep-water tonguefish)
 Symphurus plagiusa (Linnaeus, 1766) (Black-cheek tonguefish)
 Symphurus plagusia (Bloch & J. G. Schneider, 1801) (Dusky-cheek tonguefish)
 Symphurus prolatinaris Munroe, Nizinski & Mahadeva, 1991 (Half-striped tonguefish)
 Symphurus pusillus (Goode & T. H. Bean, 1885) (Northern tonguefish)
 Symphurus regani M. C. W. Weber & de Beaufort, 1929
 Symphurus reticulatus Munroe, 1990
 Symphurus rhytisma J. E. Böhlke, 1961 (Patch-tail tonguefish)
 Symphurus schultzi Chabanaud, 1955
 Symphurus septemstriatus (Alcock, 1891) (Seven-band tonguefish)
 Symphurus stigmosus Munroe, 1998 (Blotch-fin tonguefish)
 Symphurus strictus C. H. Gilbert, 1905 (Black-belly tonguefish)
 Symphurus tessellatus (Quoy & Gaimard, 1824)
 Symphurus thermophilus Munroe & Hashimoto, 2008 (Western Pacific tonguefish)
 Symphurus trewavasae Chabanaud, 1948 (Trewavas' tonguefish)
 Symphurus trifasciatus (Alcock, 1894) (Three-band tonguefish)
 Symphurus undatus C. H. Gilbert, 1905
 Symphurus undecimplerus Munroe & Nizinski, 1990 (Dark-cheek tonguefish)
 Symphurus urospilus Ginsburg, 1951 (Spot-tail tonguefish)
 Symphurus vanmelleae Chabanaud, 1952 (Vanmelle's tonguefish)
 Symphurus variegatus (Gilchrist, 1903)
 Symphurus varius Garman, 1899 (Mottled tonguefish)
 Symphurus williamsi D. S. Jordan & Culver, 1895 (William's tonguefish)
 Symphurus woodmasoni (Alcock, 1889)

References

Cynoglossidae
Taxa named by Constantine Samuel Rafinesque
Marine fish genera